Melvin Hayes (born April 28, 1973) is a former American football tackle. He played for the New York Jets from 1995 to 1996.

References

1973 births
Living people
American football offensive tackles
Mississippi State Bulldogs football players
New York Jets players